Madonna Della Strada may refer to:

 Madonna Della Strada icon in the Church of the Gesù in Rome
 Madonna Della Strada Chapel in Chicago
 Marian sanctuary in Roggiano Gravina, Italy
 Madonna della Strada (Scoppito), a hamlet in the Province of L'Aquila, Italy
 Santa Maria della Strada, an abbey in the Province of Campobasso, Italy